Pacchionian foramen means: 
 incisurae tentorii (aka tentorial notch)
 a thick opening in the center of the diaphragm of sella through which the infundibulum passes

The Pacchionian foramen (incisura tentorii) is important due to some types of brain herniation through it, i.e. supratentorial, infratentorial herniation.

Tentorium cerebelli
The tentorium cerebelli divides the cranial cavity into two closed spaces which communicate with each other through the incisura tentorii. The larger
anterior space includes the anterior and middle cranial fossas and lodges the cerebrum; the small posterior space— the posterior cranial fossa contains the cerebellum, the pons, and the medulla.

References

Cerebrum